Sohan Roy is an Indian entrepreneur and film director and producer based at Sharjah. He is the founder, chairman, and CEO of Aries Group of Companies, and a Naval Architect.

Early life and career 

Sohan Roy started his career as a Marine engineer, and later worked as a marine surveyor at several companies. He started Aries Marine & Engineering Services in 1998, Headquartered in Sharjah, UAE.

Roy directed the film DAM999 whose screenplay was added to the permanent core collection in the library of the Academy of Motion Picture Arts and Sciences. His Aries group has taken over actor Mohanlal's Vismayas Max studio complex, Kerala's first DTS studio, situated at Thiruvananthapuram.  He worked as Project Designer of World’s second CSR movie – Aickarakkonathe Bhishaguaranmaar.

He is the founder-director of Concept Indywood, Founder President of Indywood Billionaires Club. 

Roy is also a poet and author, he has been writing four line short poetry, known as 'Anukavyam' every day for the past two years.

Awards and accomplishments 
Forbes listed Roy among top Indian leaders of the Arab world four times in a row since 2015 to 2019.

He was honored with the Honorary Professional Doctorate Certificate in Global Leadership and Management by European International University (EIU), Paris.

He was awarded with Knighthood of Parte Guelfa, thus becoming first Indian to be awarded with this award.

Filmography

External links

References 

1967 births
English film directors
Malayalam film producers
Businesspeople from Kollam
Living people